Allowoodsonia is a plant genus in the family Apocynaceae, first described in 1967. It contains only one known species, Allowoodsonia whitmorei, endemic to the Solomon Islands in the SW Pacific.

References

External links

Flora of the Solomon Islands (archipelago)
Monotypic Apocynaceae genera
Malouetieae